Semi-Gloss is the 1997 self-titled debut studio album by Semi-Gloss.

A different recording of the song "Morning Takes the Night" appears on the band's previous EP, Teenie. The song "Eight Million Strong" appears on Teenie; the version on Semi-Gloss is a remix.

The album cover design was inspired by the 1956 Blue Note recording Volume One by Sonny Rollins.

Track listing
All songs written by Jordy Mokriski except where noted.
"Sans Expliquer" (Mokriski, Verena Wiesendanger) – 6:01
"The Sunburn Song" – 5:45
"Eight Million Strong" (David Kinnoin, Mokriski) – 3:24
"Free" – 3:17
"Summer Fields" – 4:01
"A Reason Why" – 3:26
"Latenight Stroll" – 3:25
"Groupie's Lament" – 5:35
"Whistlin' Girl" – 2:34
"Morning Takes the Night" – 5:43
"The Majestic" (Candice Belanoff, Mokriski) – 3:33

Personnel
Jordy Mokriski - guitar, vocals
Verena Wiesendanger - lead vocals, keyboards, percussion; whistling on track 9
Gregory Graf - bass
Jason Harmon - drums
Dave Berger - drums on track 7

External links
Dirt Records 1997 press kit

1997 debut albums
Semi-Gloss albums
Dirt Records albums